The following is a list of regional Burning Man events ordered alphabetically by geography. Not all of these events are affiliated with the Burning Man organization.

Africa

South Africa
 AfrikaBurn (official site)

Initiated in 2006 by Paul Jorgensen, the event was put together with the assistance of early crew members Lil Black, Robert Weinek, Paul Grose and Monique Schiess and was held for the first time in 2007 on Stonehenge Private Reserve in the Tankwa Karoo, a sparsely-inhabited semi-desert region of South Africa's Northern Cape Province.

In 2018, 11 000 people participated in building Tankwa Town, a beautiful space created by various kinds of people. The event, like many other Regionals, features artworks (some of which are burned), mutant vehicles, theme camps, much fire and many performances. It is presently the second-largest regional event outside the US, after Midburn in the Negev desert of Israel.

America

North America

Canada

British Columbia
 Brave New Whirled
Victoria's Annual Regional Decompression! Held Oct 7, 2017 – Oct 8, 2017 in Saanichton, BC
 Burn in the Forest (official site)
Official Burning Man Vancouver Regional Event, in association with the Greater Vancouver Interactive Arts Society
 Decompression
Official Burning Man Vancouver Regional Events, in association with the Greater Vancouver Interactive Arts Society: Micropolis 2010, Dustcovery 2017
 Recharge
Official Burning Man Vancouver Regional Event, in association with the Greater Vancouver Interactive Arts Society. Held for 10 years, ending in 2010
 OtherWorld (official site)

OtherWorld is a four-day, thousand person official Burning Man Regional Event at Lake Cowichan on Vancouver Island run in association with the Kindle Arts Society.

Alberta

 Freezer Burn (official site)
Alberta's official Burning Man regional event is in association with the League of Extraordinary Albertans. It is typically held on the weekend closest to the summer solstice, and 2017 will mark its 10th anniversary.

Northwest Territories
 Burn on the Bay
Part of the annual Long John Jamboree on Great Slave Lake.

Ontario
 Mooseman
Official Burning Man Toronto Regional Event, in association with BurnT Interactive Arts Society. (Now defunct)
 Hyperborea
Toronto regional having its inaugural event May 2017, associated with H.E.A.T. (Hyperborean Experiential Arts Team). (Now defunct)
 SideBurn (official site)
After a three year hiatus of Regional Burn Events, SideBurn is the 2023 Ontario Regional Burn.

Quebec
 L'OsstidBurn (official site)

Celebrating similar principals as the original Burning Man, including radical self-reliance, participative art and culture and fire. The event is held in Eastern Townships during the summer and is put on by the Brûleurs de Montréal Burners.
In 2018 l'Osstidburn held its 2nd edition between June 15 and June 17 in the Eastern Townships about two hours away from Montreal.

 taBURNak! 8 (official site)

One night decompression event.

United States

Arizona

 Saguaro Man (official site)
Arizona's annual regional burn which starts in April or May for five days. The event is held in Willcox, Arizona.
 Decompression (official site)
Arizona's annual Decompression which starts on the second Thursday of October and continues until Sunday. The event is held in Willcox, Arizona.

California

Los Angeles 

 BEquinox (official site)
BEquinox is the annual regional 3–4-day campout held around the time of the spring equinox in March. Although it is considered the Los Angeles regional burn, it is held in California City. It is meant to serve as a mini-Burn.
 LA Decompression (official site)
LA Decom is the annual official LA regional decompression organized by the LA Burning Man regional team and the LA League of Arts, often held at the Los Angeles State Historic Park. It is meant to be a ramp-down from the official event.
 Venice Afterburn (official site)
Two-day event with Burning Man art installations, mutant vehicles, theme camps, music, performances on Venice Beach.

San Diego 

 YOUtopia. (official site)
YOUtopia is the annual regional 4-day campout from June 7, 2023 to June 11, 2023 in Jacumba, CA - De Anza Springs Resorts San Diego.

San Francisco 

 Decompression (official site)
This is an annual regional event held each October in San Francisco. With roots going back at least as far as 1999, it offers Burning Man participants a chance to decompress: to reconnect and to share artistic performances and installations.
 MPYRE Strikes Back! (official site)
The first, ongoing, Official Burning Man Regional Event that is one day, FREE-to-the-PUBLIC, no tickets, gates, or boundaries. It is held in Del Monte Beach in Monterey, California.
 Soulfire. (official site)
Formerly called Soulstance, Soulfire is the annual regional 3-day campout in mid-June just outside Los Gatos.
 Summer Of Spark 2017: TTITG (official site)
A family-friendly burner community event which celebrates the spirit of self-expression and creativity by gathering together at Gibson Ranch Park in Elverta, CA for one day to share art, music, workshops, community activities, education, etc. and then end the celebration with a temporary art installation burn in symbolic tradition.
 unSCruz. (official site)
unSCruz is the annual 4-day Santa Cruz Burning Man Regional community campout held the beginning of May in Santa Cruz.

Colorado 

 Apogaea (official site)
In 2016, attendance was set to 1,750.
 Denver DeCOmPression (official site)
Hosted by Denver Burners, In 2016, attendance will be set to 2,000.
 Decom:Boulder Dust.oFF (official site)
One day Decompression event for burners in the Boulder, CO area.
 Colorado Burnal Equinox (official site)
Hosted by Denver Burners In 2016, attendance was set to 700.

Connecticut 

 NECTR (official site)
NECTR is an outdoor camping experience detached from commodities and focused on art and community. It is a participant-driven experience in the woods where all the infrastructure before, during, and after is provided by the attendees.  Through self-expression, gifting, and immediacy – it is meant to be transformative.

Florida

 Love Burn (official site)
held in late January, early February on Virginia Key on the beach in Miami. Attendance is split evenly between out-of-state participants and in-state participants.
 Florida Afterburn (official site)
held in November. Previously at Maddox Ranch in Lakeland FL. As of 2019 is at Lake Wales, Florida
 Florida en F.u.ego
A Burning Man-inspired, 10 principled burn community, all-inclusive, all ages intentional community located near Tallahassee in Monticello FL. on 85.5 acres private with a 3 acre Miccosukee spring-fed lake, the property, dubbed "Xanadu" The Burn is Called Fuego De Mayo and in held the first weekend of every May. with a 3-acre spring-fed lake. They hold several events throughout the year. More information can be found at (official site).

Georgia
 ABSERD – Atlanta Based SE Regional Decomp (official site)
ABSERD is the only official Burning Man sanctioned event in Georgia.
 Alchemy (official site)
It is held first weekend of October. Attendance was 3,200 in 2018.
 Euphoria
Held in Spring every other year.

Idaho 

 Idaho Decompression (official site)
Hosted by Idaho Burners Alliance, Burner Decompression is generally held the first weekend of October at the maker space Xanadu on the outskirts of Garden City, Idaho.

Illinois 

B.U.R.N. Burn 
Hosted by Bold Urban Renaissance Network, B.U.R.N. Burn is held in May less than two hours outside of Chicago.

Iowa 

 Hearthsophyre (official site)
 A weekend of camping, theme camps, art projects, music, fire, performances, and effigy burning in central Iowa.

Kansas

 Resonance (official site)
Resonance, sponsored by Wichita Burners, is an annual burn that began in 2008.
 This Event Is Cancelled (official site)
This Event Is Cancelled (TEIC), sponsored by Topeka Area Burners, is an annual burn that began in 2014.  As the name of the event may suggest, this event is known to have a more adult atmosphere, and historically has embraced themes that mock, while fully embracing burner culture.

Kentucky

 Reclaimation (official site) 
A five-day event held in the foothills of the Appalachian Mountains in Irvine, KY. This burn began in 2008 with 33 participants and is growing slowly but steadily.

Massachusetts

 Firefly Arts Collective (official site)
This is considered the Massachusetts/New England regional burn and has been organized by a group of Boston Burners (official site) since its inception in 2003. It has moved around over the years, its first year being held in New Hampshire and has since settled in Vermont. It is still looking for a larger site than the ~60 acres used in 2009–2016. 600 tickets were sold for 2011 (capped) and 1050 tickets in 2016 (capped), largely restricted by limited nearby parking.

Michigan

 Lakes of Fire (official site) 
is held every June, usually father's day weekend, at Lucky Lake campground in Rothbury, MI.

Minnesota

That Thing at the Cabin (TTatC) https://www.ttatc.com/ (official website)

Missouri

Columbia 

 HullabalU (official site)
An all ages camping event presented by the Midwest Burners in Hartsburg, MO

Kansas City 

 InterFuse (official site)
sponsored by the Midwest Burners, is an annual, multi-day, camping-oriented event that upholds the ideals of the Burning Man Festival. The goal of InterFuse is to unite the scattered Burners and pre-Burners of the Midwest in a celebration of art, fire, and life, further spreading the Burning Man Experience through the region. The event was initially held at Camp Ozark Avalon, located in Boonville, Missouri but in 2012 events were moved to the Shriner's campground in Laquey to accommodate growing attendance. 2016 ticket sales were set at 1200 and sold out. In 2016, Interfuse was changed to an "All Ages" event, allowing the participation of minors. The safety rangers of the event ("InterRangers") proudly offer Black Rock Ranger training and practical experience to those wishing to become BRC Rangers on the Playa. Instead of a Division of Public Works, or DPW, Interfuse's public works crew is known as TLA (The Leisure Army). Their motto, "All leisure, no army" is an inside joke that tells very little about all of the hard work they do in setting up the event infrastructure and keeping the essential services available and running. The 2020 InterFuse event has a population of 1400 burners 18+ and however many burners 0–17 who arrive.

St. Louis 

 Gateway Burn (official site)
St. Louis regional burn which has been occurring formally since 2008.  Gateway takes place in mid-June. Attendance is now greater than 500 participants. The 2011 and 2012 Gateway Burns took place near Eldridge, Missouri. The 2016 event was moved to land near Belle, MO.

Nevada

 Reno Decompression
Reno Burners present a night of decompressing after falling back into the world from Black Rock City.
 SNRG (official site)
Burning Man Regional Event held in Beatty, NV (known as The Forgotten City prior to 2016). The Southern Nevada Regional Gathering, or SNRG (pronounced "Synergy"), is a Burning Man regional event produced by the Las Vegas region.

New York

 Burnal Equinox (official site)
The Burnal Equinox is an arts and cultural event held in locations all over the world. It marks the halfway point to the next Burning Man event, which is held over Labor Day each year in Nevada. It is a chance, in the dark of winter, to celebrate Burner culture – interactive art, music, performance, workshops and more. It also kicks off the "build season," where participants start to work on the projects they will bring to Burning Man in August. At the Burnal Equinox, artists will bring their installations from previous Burning Man events or the start of their upcoming projects to share.
 POrtalBurn (official site)
Started in 2013; 2015 was POrtalBurn's first year as Upstate New York's sanctioned regional burn. The event is held in the summer in the Ithaca/Finger Lakes region with current ticket cap at 420 tickets
 Disorient Country Club  (official site)
Started in 2011, Disorient Country Club is a 4 day 4 night renegade burn in the Catskills.  This off-grid deep dive features interactive art, music, art cars, art boats and forest adventures. Typically held over Memorial Day weekend.
Disorient Country Club Wiki
Barning Man  (official site)
New Paltz renegade burn. Barning Man is a community based in the Hudson Valley that adheres to the Ten Principles of Burning Man and the Eleventh Principle: Consent!

North Carolina

 Coracle
Coracle is a community focused arts and cultural event held at Shakori Hills in Pittsboro, NC. It is held during the first weekend of November.

North Dakota 

 http://www.portalburn.com/Melting Man
North Dakotas longest running and only regional event! Celebrated in the last weekend in February, Melting Man is almost exactly what it sounds like. There's an ice effigy right by a nice cozy fire and everyone hangs out and warms up while the effigy melts down.

Ohio

 Scorched Nuts (official site)
Started in 2007, this Official Burning Man Regional is held at "Reclaim" outside Rutland (remote, private location in southern Ohio) annually over Memorial Day weekend. The site is a restored strip mine that provides a large, flat green space on the man-made plateau surrounded by beautiful woodland. The site is completely primitive but for a large stage open for performance and community.
 Mosaic Experiment (official site)
Mosaic Experiment brings the artistry and energy of Black Rock City to the Midwestern region. Held in October at Reclaim, a repurposed strip-mine near Rutland, Ohio, Mosaic is a four-day event (Thursday through Sunday) of collaborative expression on a backdrop of brisk evenings and changing leaves. Participants from 13 different US states attended the first event in October 2013. It is the first and only Ohio regional burn to be all-ages, and is Ohio's second regional burn officially sanctioned by the Burning Man Project.

Oregon

 BurnOut (official site)
 Presented by Precipitation NorthWest, Portland. Indoor and outdoor.
 SOAK (official site)
 Started in 2005, the official Burning Man Portland Regional is held at various sites in northwestern Oregon. In 2015, the burn moved to Tygh Valley, OR. SOAK incorporates various theme camps from Oregon and the region and typically includes an effigy burn and a Temple burn. The name comes from the wet climate in Oregon, and it has rained during the event in more than one year. The 2015 event was capped at 1300 people.

Pennsylvania

Playa del Fuego, Tamaqua, Pennsylvania, held in May (Memorial Day). (official site)
The East Coast's first sanctioned Regional, and one of the oldest in the US. Formerly in Delaware.
Summerisle Burn, Bedford, PA.  Held over the week of the summer solstice (June 21–24) (official site )
Guided and inspired by Burningman's 10 principles, Summerisle is a creative expression of collaborative community building held in the several hundred-acre wooded foothills of Fort Royale Farm.  No ticket cap as of 2019. Registered PA nonprofit.

Artemas
 Wickerman (official site)
Held each June at a secluded campground on Sideling Hill Creek

South Carolina
 Emergence (official site)
 April 2023 on a nature reserve near Charleston, SC. 2023 Attendance will be capped about 700. Guided and inspired by Burningman's 10 principles.

Tennessee

 To The Moon (official site)
To The Moon, the eastern Tennessee regional burn, is held each June on at Catoosa Event Center on the Cumberland Plateau. As an all-ages burn which abides by the Ten Principles, TTM applied for and received sanctioned status by Burning Man in its second year, 2017. The burn has grown from 550 participants in 2016 to just under 1000 in 2018, selling out its population capacity each year. 2022 capacity will be 1500.

Texas

Austin

 Burning Flipside (official site)
 Memorial Day Weekend – The event was first held in 1998 at a private campground in Dripping Springs, Texas. In 2010, the event moved to a more spacious area at Apache Pass to accommodate greater attendance. Flipside's location is generally in a private camp area in the wooded, grassy Texas Hill Country.
 FreezerBurn (official site)
 MLK Day Weekend – A regional camping event inspired by Flipside and Burning Man, where art, music, food, self-expression and entertainment are brought by the participants, where volunteers come together to create art and performances, and to experiment in temporary community.
 Burnt Soup [Formerly known as OrFunner] (official site)
 Labor Day Weekend, featuring a pool, live music, and theme camps. Lasts five days.

North Texas

 Myschievia (official site)
Indigenous Peoples' Day Weekend in October – Myschievia began in 2005, when approximately 200 participants attended a location about 2 hours west of the Dallas/Fort Worth Metroplex. Since 2006, Myschievia has been held in East Texas near Hughes Springs, Texas. Much like the Burning Man or any regional Burn, a theme may be chosen around which participants can creatively interact, though Myschievians chose not to have a theme in 2006 and 2007. Activities range from water balloon flights, to morning yoga classes, to themed dinners, to the annual Miss Myschievia pageant. The theme for the first year was "Trial By Fire," an old west courtroom-styled theme. In 2006 the effigy was of the Roman Coliseum and featured several nights of spontaneous wrestling, both staged and real. In 2007 a giant head was constructed with a movable mouth. Its wild "hair," made of individual lengths of 2x6 lumber, was decorated and donated by the participants, who called the effigy "Unruly Man." For 2008, the theme was "Burning Bridges," and the effigy for 2008 was a bridge. In 2009, Pyrosynthesis was the theme, with the effigy being a flowerpot that participants could fill with their own "flowers," individual works of art intended to burn.

San Antonio
 Alma Burn
Alma Burn began in 2017, with approximately 300 participants.

Corpus Christi
Beachside
A volunteer driven beach clean up and burn that follows the 10 principles of Burning Man .
We adopted a stretch of beach (6.7 miles) through the General Land Office in 2014 and have been doing four of these events a year since. 
This summer event is our largest of the year.

Houston, Texas

Unbroken Spring
Each year, the Houston area burner community holds an all-volunteer run, camping experiment of temporary community inspired by Burning Man in celebration of art, music, creativity and radical self-expression. To attend the event you must be at least 21 years of age.

Central Texas

 Freezer Burn (official site) – January
Freezer Burn began in 2009.  It is a local arts and music festival located in Flatonia, TX where art, music, food, self-expression and entertainment are brought by the participants, where volunteers come together to create art, performances and to experiment in temporary communities. It is a private camping event held on private property.  Much like the Burning Man or any regional Burn, a theme is chosen each year around which participants can creatively interact.  The theme for 2014 was Scorched Snowflakes, with a snowflake temple effigy.

Utah

 Element 11 (official site)
Element-11 is one of the many annual Regional Burningman Festivals conducted around the world. Element-11 is a Utah Regional and is held at Stargazer Ranch, in Utah (coordinates: 41.58075 -113.37162). Starting this year the Element-11 festival has increased from a three to four-day event, it begins on the Wednesday before the second weekend in July and ends on the Sunday of the same weekend. As of 2016 it is an all ages event and will continue to promote and teach Burningman's 10 Guiding Principles. It is a local community produced festival (Element-11 is a 501(c)(3) Non-Profit Organization) and encourages radical self-expression and participation and strictly adheres to its Leave No Trace policy (what is brought in, should be brought out).

Vermont

 Firefly Arts Collective (official site)
This is considered the Massachusetts/New England regional burn and has been organized by a group of Boston Burners (official site) since its inception in 2003. It has moved around over the years, its first year being held in New Hampshire and has since settled in Vermont. It is still looking for a larger site than the ~60 acres used in 2009–2016. 600 tickets were sold for 2011 (capped) and 1050 tickets in 2016 (capped), largely restricted by limited nearby parking.

Virginia

 Ignite (official site)
 Ignite is the first Virginia regional burn sanctioned by (Burningman) and guided by the 10 Guiding Principles.  Originally it was Transformus's Town Hall and work-play weekend before official sanction in 2015. Features theme camps, music, dancing, fire performances, and an effigy burn, with a focus on child-friendly activities.

Washington
 Critical Northwest (official site)
Critical Northwest (or CNW), formerly Critical Massive, is an annual alternative arts and performance festival staged in the greater Puget Sound region of Washington. Critical Northwest was started in 2002 by Burning Man participants from the Seattle area. The Massive organization became the Massive LLC in 2004 with a board of six members. In 2006, Ignition Northwest assumed producer responsibilities for the event, their board appoints a producer each year.The original board produced the event at a local clothing-optional resort, Lake Bronson, in Monroe, Washington before moving the event to Lake Recreation Associates Campground (or LARC) in Mount Vernon, Washington in 2006, and the privately held campground of River outside of Maple Valley, Washington in 2007, returning to LARC 2008–2015 with the exception of 2013, when the event was held at the Shelton Fair Grounds. Ignition Northwest signed a 10-year contract with Masonic Family Park in Granite Falls early January 2016, establishing a permanent home for the event.The event is attended primarily by participants of the Seattle, Oregon, and British Columbia Burning Man community, with some participants coming from as far away as the United Kingdom. Much like Burning Man, Critical Northwest relies heavily on large theme camps, art, and individual participants to build the temporary village. Art grants are distributed through the local Burner-based nonprofit organization, Ignition Northwest. In 2007, approximately $7,500 was distributed to multiple art projects, over $12,000 was awarded in 2015.Many of the core values of Critical Northwest are borrowed from Burning Man, and the same short, memorable terms are used for them. Due to the fact that the event is held in the highest population density center of the Pacific Northwest region, including Idaho, Oregon, and portions of British Columbia, the event's environment is significantly different than the Black Rock Desert. The event has been held on the west side of the Cascade mountain range in the Pacific Northwest rain forest. Consequently, the size of the event with the number of participants has been limited significantly simply for the fact that there are few venues capable of holding several individuals for a week-long event in the Northwest. Attendance has been variable over the years, with almost 1100 people in 2013, and an average of 700 participants when hosted at LARC. Capacity at the new permanent venue is set at 800 for 2016, with ability to grow well beyond 1,000.Additionally, unlike Burning Man where the central effigy of a glowing neon man stays essentially unaltered from year to year (with alteration to its base and other design elements), the Critical Massive event may not have a central effigy, or indeed a last-night event. Usually, fire performances and other exhibitions occur on the last night of the event, but are limited in scope and size due to fire restrictions, especially in the forest-fire prone mountains.

West Virginia 

 Frostburn (official site)
Frostburn is a winter celebration of art and community on Marvin's Mountaintop in Masontown, West Virginia a short distance from Morgantown. The regional burn promotes the Ten Principles of Burning Man in a harsh environment, highlighting the need for community members to collaborate against severe weather to create and install interactive art and theme camps. A gift economy is encouraged, while commercial activity is generally prohibited. Frostburn participants are expected to actively contribute to the spirit of the event in radically expressive (but socially responsible) ways, leaving no trace of their presence after the event has ended.  Frostburn took place for its first five years at Cooper's Lake Campground, which also serves as the site of the annual Pennsic War (the largest annual event of the Society for Creative Anachronism). For the next two years, Frostburn was held Camp Kevin, further north near Brookville, PA, before moving south to Marvin's Mountaintop outside of Masontown, WV for 2015.  Frostburn happens yearly during Presidents Day weekend in February.
 Constellation (official site)
Constellation is an experiment in community-based on the Ten Principles of Burning Man, intended for community members of the region to come together to connect, explore, build, burn, heal, dance and challenge themselves beyond the boundaries of what they all think possible. Founded by the Board members of the Playa Del Fuego non-profit, as well as multiple volunteer coordinators, Constellation is typically held in October (Indigenous Peoples' Day weekend) at Pegasus Farm Campground in Elkins, West Virginia.
 Transformus (official site)
Every year our global family converges to create Mysteria; a city of art, fire, freedom and dreams inspired by that thing in the desert called Burning Man but done up in our own unique style.  Started in 2004, originally the North Carolina Burn, it had its regional status revoked by Burning Man organization but was reinstated in 2010, and took place in Masontown, WV at Marvins Mountaintop in 2018. Participants under the age of 18 were previously not allowed, but have been approved as of 2018.

Wisconsin 
Wisconsin - Flaming Cheese. An annual burn/campout in the Driftless region of Wisconsin. Usually in early to mid June. The inaugural event took place in 2022.

South America

Argentina
 FuegoAustral (official site) The first official regional event in Latin América. Was held for the first time in 2016. Around 300 participants attended the event.

Australasia

Australia
New South Wales & Victoria:
 Burning Seed (official site)

This previous regional Burning Man event in Matong State Forest, NSW, has been held annually in most years since 2011. The location has come to be called Red Earth City, due to the reddish colour of the Australian outback soil. The event occurs in September/October each year, coinciding with the NSW Labour Day public holiday. The 2022 event is scheduled for September 29 to October 3, and is expected to be capped at 1,000 participants. Burning Seed is owned by Red Earth City Pty Ltd, a private company.

Western Australia:
 Blazing Swan (official site)
Taking place in the wheatbelt town of Kulin, WA. The event occurs around Easter each year, with the 2017 event scheduled for April 12–18 and will mark the 4th year and 6th event held by Blazing Swan Inc. The event location is in dry bushland near Jilakin Lake and Rock and is referred to as Jilakin Rock City. Each year a swan-shaped wooden effigy has been built and burned at the culmination of the event. Attendance was capped at 2000 people in 2015 and 43 registered theme camps, and 2500 people in 2016 and 58 registered theme camps. Blazing Swan is a registered Not For Profit organisation.

Queensland:
 Modifyre
The regional Burning Man event for Queensland and northern New South Wales, held annually in most years since 2015. Modifyre is an event of BURN Arts Inc., a not-for-profit community-owned organisation. An insect-shaped effigy and a temple is burned at each event. It had 350 participants in 2018.

Taiwan
 Turtle Burn (official site)

New Zealand
 Kiwiburn (official site)
The regional Burning Man event in Hunterville had 2,163 participants in 2020. Kiwiburn has been held annually since 2004.

Europe

Austria
 Mindburn (official site) 
is a regional Burn in Styria. Mindburn 2016 happened 2–7 August in Steinberg near Hitzendorf. It is a colorful festival filled with art, celebration, music, performances, workshops, games and discussion. It had 70 participants in 2013, 64 participants 2014.

 Schloss Schönburn (official site) 
a decompression event sponsored by Austrian Burners, starting for the first time on Okt. 5–8 2017 in Palace Wetzlas near Vienna. 150 participants have registered 2017. Schloss Schönburn 2018 will take place on Sept. 19–23 in the same location, 200 participants are expected.
 Vienna Burning Ball (official site) 
a decompression event sponsored by Austrian Burners happening every January in Vienna. It had 450 participants in 2014, 500 in 2015, and 550 in 2016.

Finland
 Helsinki Decompression (official site)
was held early December 2016. It was the first official Burning Man event in Finland: The event place Cirko in Suvilahti was filled with two days of art, performances, workshops and music, co-created with participants.

France

 Paris Burning Night (official site)
is a decompression organized regularly since 2006 by the French Burners non-profit (no fixed date). The last one on December 8, 2018, had 1,200 participants and was held at le Cabaret Sauvage. Paris Decom is an official regional event sanctioned By Burning Man. 
 Crème Brûlée WE – (official site)
is a regional Burn in France. The first Crème Brûlée 2016 was held 13–16 May on farmland in Vexin National Park, 70 km from Paris. It had 250 participants. It was held again in 2017 and 2018. The 2018 edition was in May the Creuse department and had 500 participants. It is an official regional event sanctioned By Burning Man

Germany
 Kiez Burn (official site) 
Since 2017, usually mid-end of June in Brandenburg region (near Berlin), attendance around 450 in 2017 and around 1000 in 2021/2022. Its 11 principles are derived from the original 10, but replace "Civic Responsibility" with "Community" and "Consent", combining the orgiastic aspect of the event with an emphasis on kindness, mutual responsibility, and clear communication.
 Burning Bär (official site)
Burning Bär is inspired by Burning Man and Nowhere and follows the core principles of Burning Man. On February 26–28, 2016 Burning Bär: Plug and Play took place in a castle in Beesenstedt with more than 400 participants. In 2017 Burning Bär was held on February 24–26 and on February 23–25, 2018 at the same location with around 500 participants. (Cancelled)
 Burning Burg (official site)
Burning Burg is a Burner event in Germany and started in 2008. It takes place in Castle Lutter.

Ireland 
 Eiru

A weekend event that typically takes place in June. Set on a private ecofarm in County Wexford attracts burners from all over the world but remains a small event.

Italy

 Italian Burning Boots (official site)

A 4-day event in the Apennine Mountains, first held in 2015, which is oriented to arts and hiking. (Cancelled)

Netherlands
 Contraburn
 Held during the original black rock desert version but this one is on a small island 15 km from Amsterdam. In the middle of a grass desert with lakes and swimming pool. First held in 2018.
 Dutch Decompression (Amsterdam) 2014, 2015, 2016, 2017, 2018, 2019. Not held in 2020 due to the Covid-19 situation.
 Where the Sheep Sleep (official site)
 Held in the Veluwe area, featuring art, theme camps, performances and music. First held July 29–31, 2016 at Kootwijk (near the Dutch Desert), with 750 participants; the 2017 edition was a day longer July 27–31, 2017 at Apeldoorn. The 2018 edition of WtSS, which was held July 26–30, encountered unusually dry and hot weather conditions with temperatures over 38C/100F. Due to a long period of no rain before the event, all fire was forbidden by the authorities which led to the inception of a water-based 'Burn' at the end of the event. In 2019 the event moved to a terrain near Zeewolde where the infrastructure allows for future growth of the event. It was held in the last weekend of June. The 2020 event sold out very quickly but had to be cancelled due to the Covid situation. Tickets remain valid for 2021 in the expectation that the Covid situation would be relieved by then or could be refunded. Because the Covid situation still didn't allow the organization of the event the 2021 edition also had to be cancelled. Tickets remain valid for the next edition.

Romania
The first RoBurn was held in December 2019 in Bucharest. It was followed by RoBurn “Peculiar Turnout” during July 31 - August 3, 2020, and an event by the Black Sea from July 30 to August 2, 2021.

Spain
 Nowhere (official site)
Nowhere is a pan-European event. It had around 2200 participants in 2016, 3000 in 2017 and 3600 in 2022.

Sweden
 Urban Burn Stockholm – Bizarre Star Bazaar was held in Stockholm in March 2016.
 Spark in the Dark (official site) was held in Helsingborg, Sweden, from December 28, 2016 to January 2, 2017, with over 350 participants. The event was based on the Ten Principles of Burning Man, with an eleventh principle of Consent.
 Urban Burn Stockholm – The Eclectical Spectacle was held in Stockholm in April 2017.
 Urban Burn Stockholm – The Divine Dynamis was held in April 2018 in the venue Nobelberget, Sickla. The after-parties for Friday and Saturday migrated next door to Noden (Synthiest community Temple).
 The Borderland (official site) originating from Sweden and temporarily held in Denmark from 2015 until 2019 at different sites including Boesdal kalkbrud. and Hedeland until 2019. The Borderland is a festival of art, music, co-creation and community. The festival first took place in Sweden in 2011 at Gylleboverket near Kivik (50 participants), The event has its cultural roots in a LARP in 2002 that was one of the main inspirations for Borderland called Futuredrome (movie). It moved back to Sweden in 2022 taking place for the first time on property owned by the non profit organization. The land was bought after the 2020 event was cancelled and a large part of ticket owners (or Borderland membership holders in Borderland speech) decided to donate their membership fees for that cause. 
 Before 2022 Borderland was a nomadic event with changing sites: Tidahold, 2012 (100 participants). In 2013 it moved to Hide Kulturbrott on the Swedish island of Gotland, (150 participants). In 2014 it attracted 300 participants. 2015–2017 it was held in Denmark, at Boesdal Kalkbrud, and was no longer hosted in Sweden from then on. Populations in the following years were: 2015: 500, 2016: 910, 2017: 1540. In 2018 the event moved to Hedeland with about 2000 participants.

United Kingdom
 Nest (official site)
A secluded lakeside grassy Burn in Devon, UK with a maximum capacity of 499 participants.

2022: 30 May – 5 June
2020: 25–31 May - Didn't Happen 
2019: 20–27 May
2018: 4–10 June
2017: 23–9 May
2016: 25–31 May

 MicroBurn (official site)
A Burn with a max. capacity of 150 participants, held in the lush hills of Powys, Wales. 

2020 Dates: 17th–21st Sept

 London Decompression (official site)
 Moowhere 
A Burn held in a cow farm in East Sussex, for max 30 participants.

2021: 15–18 July
2020: 16–19 July

 Celtic Burn (Scotland) 
An event inspired by the 10 Principles of Burning Man in Scotland.

Middle East

Israel
The Midburn (official site) event is the official regional event organized by the Midburn community – the Israeli Burning Man community. For six days, a temporary city is set up in the Negev desert, creating a platform which will allow a communal lifestyle, creativity, art and radical self-expression. It is held yearly since 2014, in May or June, around the Jewish holiday of "Shavuot." The third Midburn event, in 2016, had an attendance of 8,000 participants. In 2017, more than 10,000 people attended, making it the 2nd biggest regional event outside the US, after AfrikaBurn.

Contraburn is an event organized by the Midburn community that takes place every year on the weekend of the Burning Man event. In 2019, 2,000 participants are expected.

Burnerot (translates "Candles Burn") is a weekend event organized by the Midburn community that takes place every year at the end of December, close to Hanukkah. In 2018 it had an attendance of 2,000 participants.

Virtual World Cyber Space
Burn2 (official site)
Burn2 is the original officially recognized Burning Man regional in the virtual world (cyber space). Burn2 occupies a region (simulator or "sim") in Second Life® year-round, with extra regions added to their virtual space during its annual event nicknamed "Octoburn". Burn2 is run by a group of volunteers that include people directly involved with Burning Man, digital artists with a genuine interest in Burning Man, along with seasoned Second Life® programmers. The Burn2 regional is open year-round to WELCOME HOME BURNERS. This digital playa is unique in that it provides a home to Burners who may not be able to travel to their local regional. Participation is from Burners from all over the world! Burn2 offers classes for those interested in building in a digital world, offers mentors for newbies, and throws some fantastic parties! 
The core Ten Principles of Burning Man are celebrated, demonstrated and encouraged. Burn2 has many of the elements of the Burning Man Event, including being set in a desert playa virtual environment. At Burn2, you will experience many of the same organized groups as Burning Man; such as Greeters- who are the first people you meet at the entrance to events; Lamplighters- guardians of the Ten Principles and bringers of the flame to the virtual playa and the Temple; Fire Dancers- the Lamplighters who give special performances at selected events, Rangers- specially trained mediators always ready to help Burners to do their best to practice the Ten Principles of Burning Man, a Department of Mutant Vehicles- those crazy art cars you see rolling around in the dust, and Fashionistas- who loudly celebrate their Radical Self Expression in wild costumes as they strut their stuff in fashion shows on the playa!
Many talented artists generously build and gift their art to this community which is open year-round with events every quarter.
Welcome to Burn2 
Event Calendar

Burn2 Upcoming Events
NYE Burn 2022 - December 31, 2022

2023 Planning is Underway!
Winter Burn: Winter Burn Wonderland - January 27-29, 2023
Burnal Equinox: (Theme TBA) - March 24-26, 2023
Conception - (Theme and Date TBA)
Octoburn 2022: Animalia - October 6-15, 2023

Past Events Burn2 2022 and prior
October 7-16, 2022 - Octoburn 2022: Waking Dreams
Burnal Equinox 2022: Time Travel - May 20–22
2/22/22 Tutu Tuesday - February 22
Winter Burn 2022: Theme Gingerbread Houses (with Jack Frost Effigy) - January 28–30
Skin Burn 2021: October 30
OctoBurn 2021: Theme: The Great Unknown - October 8–17
Burn2 Virtual Burn 2021: September 3–5
Burnstock 2021: July 23–25
Conception 2021: Theme: Emergence - July 9–11
Burnal Equinox 2021: Theme: Roaring 3020's - April 9–11
WinterBurn 2021: Theme: Bubblegum & Duct Tape - January 29–31
Skin Burn 2020: Sunday November 1, Noon & 6PM SLT
Hawks Airshow 2020: October 25 - 2pm SLT
OctoBurn 2020: Theme: Multiverse October 9 – 18
VRC (Virtual Black Rock City) 2020: August 30 - Sept 7th
Burnstock 2020 July 24–26 
HouseFire 2020 - June 5–7
Burnal Equinox 2020: Theme: Between the Stars - May 1 – 3

Previous BURN2 Events 2011–2020

Past events
Events no longer happening.

California
San Diego:
 Fuego de los Muertos, last held in October 2007

References

External links

 Burning Man official list of regional events
 The Regional Burn Showcase at Vox Ignis
 Calendar of regional Burning Man events
 Community based list of regional and local events